World War 3 is a free-to-play first-person shooter developed by The Farm 51 and published by Wishlist Games and The 4 Winds Entertainment, for Microsoft Windows. World War 3 is solely multiplayer and does not feature a single-player campaign. It features real-world locations of Warsaw, Berlin, Moscow, Smolensk and Polyarny; the locations have been extensively revamped since the early access release on October 19, 2018. The full version followed on December 10, 2022.

Gameplay 
	
World War 3 is a modern military first-person shooter set in the global conflict of a catastrophic future. 

Described as "a more hardcore Battlefield" in 2018, in June 2020 the developer The Farm 51 planned a revamp and relaunch together with the Russian publisher My.Games and co-publisher The 4 Winds Entertainment joined in 2021; in 2021 the game seemed to be moving away from the "hardcore". The developer commented that World War 3 aims for as much realism as possible without compromising gameplay: "One of our goals with World War 3 is to offer realistic simulations with an altogether enjoyable experience. We call this playable realism." The game features "an advanced ballistics system, full-body awareness, vehicle physics, and extensive customization.

References

External links 

 

2022 video games
First-person shooters
Multiplayer video games
Video games developed in Poland
Video games set in Berlin
Video games set in Moscow
Video games set in Poland
Video games set in Russia
Windows games
Windows-only games
World War III video games
The Farm 51 games